Here, There & Everywhere (HT&E), formerly known as APN News & Media, is an Australian media company. Divisions include broadcast radio and Out-of-home advertising. The company previously had assets in New Zealand, and previously owned Adshel, APN Outdoor and Gfinity eSports in Australia.

In 2015, HT&E's two largest shareholders are the Australian fund manager Allan Gray Australia and News Corp Australia. Irish company Independent News & Media and Denis O'Brien's Baycliffe held an approximately 30% stake in the company before selling it in March 2015.

History
Here, There & Everywhere had its origins in Provincial Newspapers Qld (PNQ), a listed company that published regional newspapers in Queensland and New South Wales. The Herald and Weekly Times, which owned a significant proportion of PNQ, was taken over by News Limited in 1987. To comply with an order of the Australian Trade Practices Commission, News Limited was required to sell its PNQ shares. The 48% stake in PNQ was acquired in 1988 by interests associated with the family of Tony O'Reilly, the principal shareholder of Independent Newspapers of Ireland.

The company was renamed Australian Provincial Newspapers Holdings and listed again on the Australian Securities Exchange in 1992 following a public share issue, and in 1998 the name was changed to APN News & Media.

In 2001, HT&E acquired 25% of Soprano Design. Later going on to acquire steaks in Conversant Media and Unbnd Group. These acquisitions have been listed every year in their financial reports. Soprano Design was valued at over A$500 million in November 2019, giving HT&E over A$125m in equity. Following Soprano's acquisition of SilverStreet Intl in December 2020, Analysts have stated that Soprano could be worth upward of $1 billion.

In June 2016, the company completed the demerger of its New Zealand radio and publishing business, NZME. However, the company maintained a presence in New Zealand via its outdoor advertising business, Adshel NZ. Also in 2016, the company announced it would sell its regional newspaper division, Australian Regional Media, to News Corp Australia for $36.6 million. The deal was reviewed but not opposed by the Australian Competition & Consumer Commission. The sale of ARM, encompassing APN's remaining newspaper assets, was completed in December 2016.

APN News & Media Limited changed its name to HT&E Limited in May 2017, changing its ASX Listing Code to HT1.

In June 2018, oOh!media purchased street furniture business Adshel for A$570 million from HT&E, in a competitive bidding war against rival (and former HT&E subsidiary) APN Outdoor.

In 2023, the company sold its 25% stake in communications firm Soprano.

Notable assets

Radio broadcasting (ARN)

 KIIS Network
 Pure Gold Network
 CADA
 Canberra FM Radio (50%, with SCA)
 hit104.7 (part of the Hit Network)
 Mix 106.3 (part of the KIIS and Triple M networks)
ARN Regional 
Grant Broadcasters (12%, with ARN Regional)
Chemist Warehouse Remix
 iHeartRadio (Australia)
 Nova 93.7 Perth (50% with Nova Entertainment)

Outdoor/Advertising 
CODY Out-of-Home (Hong Kong)
Emotive (creative agency)

References

Bibliography

External links

Companies based in Sydney
Newspaper companies of Australia
Companies listed on the Australian Securities Exchange
Radio broadcasting companies of Australia
Holding companies of Australia
Mass media companies of Australia